Phorelliosoma hexachaeta is a species of tephritid or fruit flies in the genus Phorelliosoma of the family Tephritidae.

References

Phytalmiinae